Solveig Kloppen (born 10 June 1971) is a Norwegian journalist, actress and TV hostess.

She is best known as hostess for "Idol", the Norwegian version of Pop Idol. She grew up in Vik in Sogn and at Jessheim.

Awards and nominations

External links

References

1971 births
Living people
Norwegian television personalities
Norwegian journalists
Norwegian television actresses
People from Vik
People from Jessheim
Place of birth missing (living people)